uWSGI is an open source software application that "aims at developing a full stack for building hosting services". It is named after the Web Server Gateway Interface (WSGI), which was the first plugin supported by the project. uWSGI is maintained by Italian based software company unbit.

uwsgi (all lowercase) is the native binary protocol that uWSGI uses to communicate with other servers.

uWSGI is often used in conjunction with web servers such as Cherokee and Nginx, which offer direct support for uWSGI's native uwsgi protocol, to serve Python web applications such as Django. For example, data may flow like this: HTTP client ↔ Nginx ↔ uWSGI ↔ Python app.

A common alternative to uWSGI is Gunicorn.

References

External links
 
 How to run uWSGI, blog post

Web server software for Linux
Software using the GPL license
Software using the GPL linking exception
Free software programmed in C
Cross-platform free software
2017 software
Free web server software